Sensitive Skin is a Canadian black comedy television series, adapted from the British series of the same name created by Hugo Blick. Its six-episode first season, written by comedian Bob Martin and directed by Don McKellar, premiered on HBO Canada on July 20, 2014. A six-episode second season, with production resuming in spring 2015 in Toronto, premiered on May 15, 2016. On May 7, 2017, the show's official Twitter account informed fans that it was not picked up for a third season.

Plot summary

Season 1
Davina, a woman in her 50s who works in a gallery, has recently moved from the suburbs into an apartment in downtown Toronto with her neurotic husband Al, a pop-culture critic. She's having trouble adjusting to life as she gets older, worrying that her looks are fading and that she has accomplished nothing of substance.

Season 2
Davina tries to adjust to life as a widow but her progress is hampered by frequent hallucinations of Al. She moves into a houseboat on the Toronto Islands and tries to forge new relationships.

Cast
Kim Cattrall as Davina Jackson: a middle-aged woman who is having difficulty with aging having been a noted beauty in her youth. She frequently hallucinates conversations with other people in which they give her sage advice or tells her what she wants to hear. Despite caring for her husband Al, she feels as though she could have done better than marry him.
Don McKellar as Al Jackson, Davina's husband: a neurotic pop-culture columnist who is also somewhat socially awkward.
Nicolas Wright as Orlando Jackson: Orlando is Davina and Al’s only son. Neurotic and depressive he often blames his parents for the way he feels. He has no sperm count and feels as though his parents resent him for being unable to give them a grandchild.
Bob Martin as Sam: Davina's friend and employer.
Colm Feore as Roger: Davina’s brother-in-law who values money above all else but is fired from his well-paying job and turns to art as a way to express himself. As an artist he develops an obsession with Davina who he makes the subject of most of his work.
Joanna Gleason as Veronica: Davina's conservative older sister who resents her for always getting what she wants.
Clé Bennett as Theodore: a drug dealer who hangs outside the Jackson's apartment he is befriended by Al and later Davina. He also has his real estate license.
Marc-André Grondin as Greg: a married archeologist that also teaches piano on the side and seduces his clients' wives. He initially tries to seduce Veronica, but after being fired by Roger is rehired by Davina to teach Al.
Elliott Gould as Dr. Cass: Al’s opportunistic physician he encourages Al to have a series of expensive medical tests not covered by OHIP.

Episodes

Series overview

Season 1 (2014)

Season 2 (2016)

Awards

The first season of Sensitive Skin was nominated for 6 Canadian Screen Awards, and won four:
 Best Actor in a Continuing Leading Comedic Role [For whom?]
 Best Direction in a Comedy Program or Series (Don McKellar)
 Best Photography (Douglas Koch, "The Three Sisters")
 Best Picture Editing in a Comedy Series (Matthew Hannam).

References

External links
 
 

2010s Canadian comedy-drama television series
2014 Canadian television series debuts
2016 Canadian television series endings
2010s black comedy television series
English-language television shows
Television series by Bell Media
Television series by Corus Entertainment
Crave original programming
Television shows filmed in Toronto